Chris Lightfoot (born 1 April 1970) is an English former professional footballer who played in the Football League for four clubs. He later managed in non-league football.

Lightfoot spent much of his career with Chester City, where he came through the youth ranks to make his debut as a 17-year-old on 19 September 1987 in a 1–0 win over Grimsby Town. He scored his first goal in his next appearance against Walsall in November 1987 and ended the season with 17 first team appearances to his name. Lightfoot joined fellow youngsters such as Brian Croft, Robbie Painter and Colin Woodthorpe in emerging from the Chester youth set-up to become first-team regulars during this period.

In future seasons Lightfoot was a regular in the Chester side, making more than 30 league appearances in each season until 1993–94. By this point Lightfoot had been converted by Graham Barrow from a central defender to an attacking midfielder, reflected in his 14 goals as Chester won promotion from Division Three.

In the summer of 1995 Lightfoot followed Barrow to Wigan Athletic for a tribunal fee of £87,500. However, by March 1996 he was on the move again when he joined Crewe Alexandra. In May 1997 Lightfoot appeared as a substitute as Crewe beat Brentford in the Division Two play-off final at Wembley Stadium, giving Lightfoot his first chance to play in the second tier in English football.

Lightfoot's final taste of league football came during a loan spell with Oldham Athletic in the early weeks of the 2000–01 season. At the end of the campaign he left Crewe and joined Conference side Morecambe, where he played for one season. In 2002, he joined Runcorn, who he became manager of in October 2003 
.
He was sacked 12 months later 
.

After spells with Marine and Leek Town, Lightfoot ended his playing days with two appearances for NEWI Cefn Druids.

Honours
with Crewe Alexandra
Football League Second Division play-off final winner: 1997

External links

Welsh Premier career details

References

1970 births
English footballers
Association football defenders
Association football midfielders
English football managers
English Football League players
Chester City F.C. players
Wigan Athletic F.C. players
Crewe Alexandra F.C. players
Oldham Athletic A.F.C. players
Morecambe F.C. players
Marine F.C. players
Cefn Druids A.F.C. players
Runcorn F.C. Halton players
Leek Town F.C. players
Runcorn F.C. Halton managers
National League (English football) players
Cymru Premier players
Living people
Association football utility players
Footballers from Warrington